Anne-Marie Green (born September 21, 1971) is a New York City-based news anchor for American television network CBS.

A Toronto native, Green earned a Bachelor of Arts degree in English from the University of Toronto and has a graduate degree in journalism from Humber College.

Green began her career as a reporter for CKVR-TV in Barrie and at Rogers Cable News in Mississauga, both located in Ontario. She was a news anchor in Toronto beginning in June 2001 with CITY-TV and also anchored at CablePulse 24, a 24-hour cable news channel servicing the greater Toronto area.

Green joined KYW-TV (CBS 3) in October 2004 as a general assignment reporter and also a co-anchor for Sunday morning newscasts alongside Ben Simoneau. In October 2012, she became a substitute anchor for CBS News' Up to the Minute. She was subsequently named the anchor for the CBS News early morning news broadcast CBS Morning News from New York City effective January 21, 2013.

Green is married to Philadelphia community activist Algernong Allen.

See also
 New Yorkers in journalism

References

External links
 Green's bio from CBS 3 website  

American television news anchors
Canadian expatriate journalists in the United States
CBS News people
Canadian television journalists
Canadian women television journalists
University of Toronto alumni
Humber College alumni
Journalists from Toronto
1971 births
Living people